Freedom is the third studio album by American Idol contestant Mandisa. The album was released on March 24, 2009. 
On April 2, 2009, the album debuted at number 83 on the Billboard 200 selling over 7,000 copies in its first week. In 2010, the album was Nominated for Grammy Award for Best Pop/Contemporary Gospel Album of the Year. After just over two years of her album "Freedom" being off the Billboard 200, it re-entered at 178.

Singles

"My Deliverer" was released as the first single from the album on January 27, 2009.

"He Is With You" was released as the second single on March 3, 2009.

"Not Guilty" was released as the third and final single from the album on July 21, 2009.

Track listing

Personnel 
 Mandisa – lead vocals, backing vocals (1, 2, 4, 6, 10)
 Christopher Stevens – keyboards (1, 2, 4, 9, 10), programming (1, 2, 4, 6, 9, 10), backing vocals (1, 2, 4, 6), additional keyboards (6), guitars (9), bass (10)
 Ron Rawls – Rhodes piano (2), keyboards (6, 9), Hammond B3 organ (6, 9)
 Blair Masters – keyboards (3, 8, 11), acoustic piano (8)
 Sam Mizell – keyboards (5, 8), programming (5, 7), string arrangements (5)
 Shane Keister – acoustic piano (8)
 Matt Stanfield – keyboards (11)
 Justin York – guitars (1, 2, 4, 6)
 Greg Hagan – electric guitar (3, 5, 7)
 Jerry McPherson – electric guitar (3, 5, 7), guitars (8)
 Mike Payne – electric guitar (3)
 Ben Glover – guitars (6)
 Bernard Harris – bass (1, 2, 4, 6, 7)
 Matt Pierson – bass (3, 11)
 James Holloway – drums (1, 2, 4, 6)
 Dan Needham – drums (3, 7, 11)
 Zach Casebolt – cello (2, 6)
 Claire Indie – violin (2, 6)
 David Davidson – strings (3)
 Brown Bannister – string arrangements (3)
 Chris Carmichael – cello (5), viola (5), violin (5)
 Michelle Swift – backing vocals (1, 5, 8, 11)
 Missi Hale – backing vocals (2, 7, 11)
 Ronnie Freeman – backing vocals (3)
 Cindy Morgan – backing vocals (3)
 Laura Cooksey – backing vocals (4)
 Blanca Reyes – rap (4)
 Nirva Ready – backing vocals (10)

Choir on "Freedom Song"
 Laura Cooksey, Jason Eskridge, Missi Hale, Lakisha Mitchell, Calvin Nowell and Michelle Swift

Technical and Design
 Brad O'Donnell – A&R 
 Chance Scoggins – vocal co-production 
 Brown Bannister – engineer, digital editing 
 Steve Bishir – engineer 
 Kent Hooper – engineer 
 Billy Whittington – engineer, digital editing 
 Kevin Powell – assistant engineer 
 David Dillbeck – digital editing 
 Craig Swift – digital editing 
 Christopher Stevens – mixing (1, 2, 4, 6, 9, 10)
 F. Reid Shippen – mixing (3, 5, 7, 8, 11)
 Buckley Miller – mix assistant (3, 5, 7, 8, 11)
 Chris Athens – mastering at Sterling Sound (New York City, New York)
 Jess Chambers – A&R administration 
 Beth Matthews – production assistant 
 Jan Cook – art direction 
 Micah Kandros – design 
 Katie Moore – design
 Kristin Barlowe – photography 
 True Artist Management – management

Charts

Certifications

References

2009 albums
Mandisa albums
Sparrow Records albums